Wigan Central railway station was a railway station near the centre of Wigan, Lancashire, England.

Location and construction
Wigan Central station was on Station Road, some way from the two main stations (North Western and Wallgate) which are on the western edge of the town centre.

Wigan Central was the eventual terminus of the Wigan Junction Railways from Glazebrook West Junction. It was built by the Manchester, Sheffield and Lincolnshire Railway (later to become the Great Central) and opened on 3 October 1892, when it replaced the temporary Wigan Darlington Street terminus, which had opened on 1 April 1884. Central was about  nearer the town centre than Darlington Street.

Operations
According to Beeching's Reshaping of British Railways (see Appendix Passenger Line Usage Map) the line was more heavily used than many which did not close, however, as with many unmodernised and heavily used commuter lines it was deemed uneconomic. The line's main passenger traffic was workers travelling from the Wigan area to industrial plants in Cadishead and Partington and around the docks in Salford and Manchester; until the late 1970s the Lancashire United bus company operated a replacement bus service from Wigan to Partington.

Steam remained the dominant motive power to the end of services, though some DMUs made an appearance.

Services
The service patterns in 1895, 1947 and 1962 are fully documented in the authoritative Disused Stations website.

In April 1884 the service pattern to Wigan (Darlington Street temporary terminus) was straightforward. Seven "Down" trains arrived from Manchester Central, one "express" called at Glazebrook only and three called at all stations. The remaining three missed some stations between Manchester and Glazebrook. With the exception of the "express", all trains called at all stations between Glazebrook and Wigan. The "Up" service was similar.

In 1922 six "Down" trains arrived, All Stations from Manchester Central on "Weekdays" (Mondays to Saturdays), with a further evening train from Lowton St Mary's only. Three other trains arrived, apparently All Stations from Culcheth, but it is possible they originated at Liverpool Central and turned west to north at Dam Lane Junction. One of these trains ran on Fridays and Saturdays only and the other two ran on Saturdays only. The "Up" service was broadly similar, but the mix of Saturday-only trains was even more complicated. There was no Sunday service.

Closure and after
The station closed to passengers on 2 November 1964 and closed to all traffic the following April. It was demolished in 1973. The Grand Arcade shopping centre was built between 2006 and 2008 on the station site, of which no trace remains.

See also
List of closed railway stations in Britain
Wigan North Western railway station
Wigan Wallgate railway station
Liverpool, St Helens & South Lancashire Railway
Old railway lines in Wigan

References

Sources

External links

Disused railway stations in the Metropolitan Borough of Wigan
Former Great Central Railway stations
Railway stations in Great Britain opened in 1892
Railway stations in Great Britain closed in 1964
Beeching closures in England
Buildings and structures in Wigan
Buildings and structures demolished in 1973